Lee County is the name of twelve counties in the United States:
 Lee County, Alabama
 Lee County, Arkansas
 Lee County, Florida
 Lee County, Georgia
 Lee County, Illinois
 Lee County, Iowa
 Lee County, Kentucky
 Lee County, Mississippi
 Lee County, North Carolina
 Lee County, South Carolina
 Lee County, Texas
 Lee County, Virginia